Lena Litvak (born 15 November 1988) is a Ukrainian-born American former tennis player.

In her career, she won one singles title and eight doubles titles on the ITF Women's Circuit. On 6 July 2009, Litvak reacher her career-high singles ranking of 325. On 17 September 2012, she peaked at No. 228 in the doubles rankings.

Career
In addition to playing tennis, Litvak attended Harvard University. There, she tried to balance college and professional tennis.

Litvak played the 2014 Citi Open losing in the first round with Alexandra Mueller.

Her last appearance on the pro tour was in February 2015, in the qualifying draw of an ITF tournament in Michigan.

ITF finals

Singles (1–0)

Doubles (8–6)

References

External links
 
 

1988 births
Living people
American female tennis players
Ukrainian emigrants to the United States
Sportspeople from the Bronx
Harvard Crimson women's tennis players